Hellman is a surname. Notable people with the surname include:

 Åke Hellman (1915–2017), Finnish centenarian, painter, and art professor
Bonnie Hellman (born 1950), American actress
C. Doris Hellman (1910–1973), American historian of science
Camilla G Hellman, MBE  Transatlantic Relations
 Danny Hellman (born 1964), American freelance illustrator and cartoonist
 Frances Hellman, American physicist
 Geoffrey Hellman, American professor and philosopher
 Geoffrey T. Hellman (1907–1977), American writer and editor
 Herman W. Hellman (1843–1906), German-born Jewish businessman, banker, and real estate investor
 Ilse Hellman (1908–1998), Austrian-British psychoanalyst
 Isaias W. Hellman (1842–1920), German-born American banker and philanthropist
 Jakob Hellman (born 1965), Swedish pop singer
 Jörgen Hellman (born 1963), Swedish politician
 Lillian Hellman (1905–1984), American dramatist and screenwriter 
 Louis Hellman (born 1936), British architect and cartoonist 
 Martin Hellman (born 1945), American cryptologist
 Monte Hellman (1932–2021), American film director, producer, writer, and editor
 Neal Hellman (born 1948), American folk musician, music teacher, and mountain dulcimer performer
 Ocean Hellman (born 1971), Canadian former actress 
 Richard A. Hellman (born 1940), American environmental consultant and attorney
 Thomas Hellman (born 1975), French-Canadian singer, songwriter, radio columnist, and author
 Vesa Hellman (born 1970), Finnish wheelchair curler and Paralympian
 Walter Hellman (1916–1975), American checkers champion
 Warren Hellman (1934–2011), American private equity investor

See also
The Hellman Building in Downtown Los Angeles, California
 Hellmann
 Helman